Raymond Walker (born 28 September 1963) is an English former professional footballer who played as a midfielder. He played 440 games for Port Vale in all competitions between 1986 and 1997, ensuring himself a place in the club's history. He was twice the club's player of the season, and was named on the PFA Team of the Year three times. He was promoted twice with the club and also played a part in the club's highest ever post-war finish in the English Football League. With Aston Villa in the early '80s, he joined Port Vale in 1986, after a short loan spell in 1984. After eleven years at Vale Park he went into non-league football with Leek Town and Newcastle Town.

Career

Aston Villa
Walker joined Aston Villa as an apprentice in July 1979, and turned professional in September 1981. He won the FA Youth Cup in 1980. He made his First Division debut in the 1982–83 season against West Ham United.

Port Vale
Walker was loaned to Fourth Division Port Vale for two months at the start of the 1984–85 season. He played fifteen games for John Rudge's side, scoring his first goal in professional football on 15 September, in a 3–1 win over Torquay United at Plainmoor. He returned to Villa Park but failed to established himself in the first team. He returned to Port Vale (now in the Third Division) on a permanent basis in July 1986 for a fee of £12,000, plus 50% of any future sale above that amount (a fee settled by a tribunal). He played 54 games in 1986–87, scoring five goals. He was voted Player of the Year by the club's supporters in 1987–88, and was also selected by the PFA for the Third Division Team of the Year. These awards were handed to him for his performances during his 53-game season, with one of his seven goals coming from a long-range effort against Tottenham Hotspur in a celebrated FA Cup Fourth Round upset. He handed in a transfer request in June 1988, following rumours that the club had turned down an offer of £150,000 from Manchester City; his request was rejected – much to the disappointment of Stoke City manager Mick Mills.

Rudge claimed that Walker and Robbie Earle had one of the best-ever midfield partnerships at the Vale. The pair helped the club win promotion in 1988–89, both men being key players in the 1989 play-off final. Walker was also selected in the PFA Team of the Year for a second successive season, scoring six goals in 56 appearances. Despite this, he said "Wait until next year. I had a bad season!" He helped the club to survive and prosper in the Second Division, and recovered from injury to post 47 appearances in 1989–90. He only scored the one goal, though it came at a crucial time, helping the "Valiants" to record a 3–2 victory over top-flight Derby County at Pride Park in the FA Cup.

He was installed as the club's penalty-taker in 1990–91, and five of his seven goals came from the spot. His performances over his fifty games resulted in him being awarded the club's Player of the Year award once again in 1991, with only David Harris before him having been handed that honour twice. He was sidelined for five months with ligament damage in September 1991, and his absence during the 1991–92 was notable, and was a factor in the club being relegated, with Vale finishing just five points from safety. He recovered to make 27 appearances over the course of the season, his two goals from coming from the spot. Walker was involved in the TNT Tournament win in summer 1992. He picked up a knee injury in April 1993 and although his performances 1992–93 saw him selected for that seasons PFA Second Division side of the year, he had to undergo a cruciate ligament operation in September 1993, which caused him to miss most of the 1993–94 season. At the end of the campaign though, Vale were promoted into the First Division as Second Division runners-up.

He spent a brief five game loan period with Second Division Cambridge United in September 1994, but managed to win his place back at Vale Park upon his return. However he was struck down by another knee injury in March 1995. He played in the 1996 Anglo-Italian Cup Final, as Vale lost 5–2 to Genoa. He made nineteen appearances in 1996–97, as Vale posted their highest ever post-WW2 finish (eighth place in the second tier). He then left the club in May 1997. His many years with the "Valiants" entitled him to a testimonial game, which finished as an 8–6 defeat to Leicester City. He played a total of 440 league and cup games for the club, scoring 43 goals.

Later career
After leaving Port Vale Walker spent time as a player-coach with Conference new boys Leek Town, including a five-game spell as caretaker manager from 17 March 1998. He played a total of 45 games in the 1997–98 season. Later that year he became player-manager at North West Counties League side Newcastle Town, where he remained until leaving to join the Crewe Alexandra academy in 2001. The "Castle" finished fourth in Division One in 1998–99, second in 1999–2000 and ninth in 2000–01.

Style of play
Known as the "Hoddle of the lower leagues", Walker was an expert passer. He boasted all the qualities of a top-flight midfielder, except pace. In May 2019, he was voted into the "Ultimate Port Vale XI" by members of the OneValeFan supporter website.

Post-retirement
As of June 2011, Walker was working as Football in the Community Officer for Crewe Alexandra.

Career statistics

Honours
Individual
Port Vale F.C. Player of the Year: 1998–88 & 1990–91
PFA Third Division Team of the Year: 1987–88 & 1988–89
PFA Second Division Team of the Year: 1992–93

Aston Villa
FA Youth Cup: 1980

Port Vale
Football League Third Division play-offs: 1989
Football League Second Division second-place promotion: 1993–94
Anglo-Italian Cup runner-up: 1996

References

Sportspeople from North Shields
Footballers from Tyne and Wear
English footballers
Association football midfielders
Aston Villa F.C. players
Port Vale F.C. players
Cambridge United F.C. players
Newcastle Town F.C. players
Leek Town F.C. players
English Football League players
National League (English football) players
Association football player-managers
English football managers
Leek Town F.C. managers
Newcastle Town F.C. managers
National League (English football) managers
Association football coaches
Crewe Alexandra F.C. non-playing staff
1963 births
Living people